Sinagra is a comune (municipality) in the Metropolitan City of Messina in the Italian region Sicily, located about  east of Palermo and about  west of Messina.

Sinagra borders the following municipalities: Castell'Umberto, Ficarra, Naso, Raccuja, Sant'Angelo di Brolo, Tortorici, Ucria.

References

External links
 Official website

Cities and towns in Sicily